USS Carnelian (PY-19) was a converted yacht that patrolled with the United States Navy in World War II. She was named for carnelian (a semi-precious stone).

Construction, acquisition, and commissioning

Carnelian was built as the yacht Trudione in 1930 by Bath Iron Works, Bath, Maine for Ross W. Judson who was president of Bath Iron Works and Continental Motors Corporation. It was named after his twin daughters, Trudi & Ione. She was renamed  Seventeen in December 1930. She was then purchased by the Navy on 13 May 1941 and commissioned on 7 June 1941.

Service history

Carnelian arrived at Jacksonville, Florida, on 23 February 1942 for patrol duty in the Caribbean. Later based on New Orleans, Louisiana for duty escorting convoys to Galveston, Texas and Key West, Carnelian provided essential services to the Gulf Sea Frontier in its task of guarding a wide area with minimal forces. From November 1942 through January 1944, the converted yacht screened convoys, composed primarily of tankers with cargoes of oil, between Trinidad and Recife, Brazil.

After overhaul, Carnelian joined the anti-submarine training group based at Norfolk, Virginia, with whom she served until 25 January 1945. Assigned then to the Potomac River Naval Command, she was based at the Mine Warfare Test Station, Solomons, Maryland, for mine test operations in Chesapeake Bay.

Carnelian was decommissioned on 4 January 1946 and transferred to the Maritime Commission on 24 October 1946.

References

External links  

Patrol vessels of the United States Navy
World War II patrol vessels of the United States
Ships built in Bath, Maine
1930 ships